Takeshi Kanazawa (金澤 岳; born May 5, 1984 in Tondabayashi), nicknamed "Kin", is a Japanese former professional baseball catcher in Japan's Nippon Professional Baseball. He played for the Chiba Lotte Marines from 2008 to 2014 and from 2016 to 2018.

References

External links

1984 births
Living people
Chiba Lotte Marines players
Japanese baseball coaches
Japanese baseball players
Nippon Professional Baseball catchers
Nippon Professional Baseball coaches
Baseball people from Tochigi Prefecture